Berserk is a manga series written and drawn by Kentaro Miura, and has been published in Japanese by Hakusensha in the magazines Monthly Animal House (1989–1992) and Young Animal (1992–). Since the late 2000s, the manga has been published irregularly, with frequent hiatuses until Miura's death in 2021. Since then, the series has been supervised by Miura's friend Kouji Mori and drawn by Studio Gaga, consisting of Miura's assistants and apprentices.

The chapters (called "episodes") are since November 26, 1990, also collected by Hakusensha in tankōbon volumes; 41 have been released as of 2021. The volumes are released in English by Dark Horse Comics since October 22, 2003; they are since February 27, 2019, also releasing hardcover editions which each collect multiple volumes. The Japanese volumes were re-released with new cover art starting in 2016, following the rebranding of Hakusensha's Jets Comics imprint as Young Animal Comics.

Volumes

Deluxe volumes
Since 2019, Dark Horse Comics publishes larger, hardcover "deluxe" volumes, each of which collects three of the regular volumes.

Chapters not released in collected volumes
The following have not been released in collected volumes as of the release of volume 41:
 083. 
 365. 
 366. 
 367. 
 368. 
 369. 
 370. 
 371.

Notes

References

External links
 

Berserk (manga)
Berserk